"Telefone (Long Distance Love Affair)" is a song by Scottish singer Sheena Easton, the first single released from her fourth album, 1983's Best Kept Secret. In November 1984, Easton added "Telefono" to her Spanish album Todo Me Recuerda a Ti for the Latin markets. The song was nominated for a Grammy in 1983 for Best Female Pop Vocal Performance.

The song was most successful in the United States, where it became Easton's fourth top 10 hit, peaking at number nine for two weeks in October and November 1983. The song was less successful in Easton's native United Kingdom where it reached number 84.

The music video, shot in black and white, featured Easton in a haunted house and a cemetery, being pursued by Dracula, Frankenstein's monster, and the Hunchback of Notre Dame before being rescued by King Kong.

Charts

Cover versions
In Mexico, the popular teen group Timbiriche released the same Spanish version. 
In the 2012 South Korean film Dancing Queen. Uhm Jung-hwa sang a cover of the song titled as "Call My Name".

References

1983 singles
Sheena Easton songs
Timbiriche songs
Dance-pop songs
Songs about telephones
Songs about telephone calls
1983 songs
Black-and-white music videos